Mahri is a village in Thathri tehsil of Doda district in Jammu and Kashmir. This village was one of the villages of Chenab Valley which was without electricity till 2022.

Histrory
Mahri village was part of Bhaderwah tehsil in 1986; it became part of Thathri tehsil when Thathri was separated as a tehsil in Doda district. , Mahri is set to be electrified for the first time in the history.

References

Villages in Doda district